Bendall is a surname. Notable people with the surname include:

Frederick Bendall (1865–1941), English cricketer
Haydn Bendall (born 1951), English record producer, engineer and mixer
Mildred Bendall (1891–1977), active force of the avant-garde in Bordeaux
Steve Bendall, self managed professional boxer born in Coventry, England
Vivian Bendall (born 1938), Conservative MP for Ilford North from 1978 until 1997